Josh Smith (born October 7, 1979) is an American blues guitar player from Fort Lauderdale, Florida. He now lives in Los Angeles and is a record producer at his studio Flat V Studios. In 2019 Guitar World magazine put Smith number 16 on their list, "The 30 best blues guitarists in the world today".

Early life
Smith was born in 1979 in Middletown, Connecticut and raised in Fort Lauderdale, Florida. He began playing guitar when he was seven years old, and at 14 years old he began playing at blues festivals. He also began making albums when he was fourteen. By the time he was 18 he had released three albums. When he was 22 he got married and moved to Los Angeles. He still resides in the Los Angeles area with his wife and children.

Career
When Smith was 16 he toured the United States with his band, Rhino Cats. The band released two independent albums, Born Under a Blue Sign and Woodsheddin'''. After the Rhino Cats Smith formed another band (a trio) which he called, Josh Smith and the Frost. He was 18 years old at the time and they released an album, Too Damn Cold. It was produced by Jim Gaines. Throughout his career he has played guitar on the albums of Taylor Hicks, Ricky Fanté, and Raphael Saadiq.

Smith is also a record producer and he owns Flat V Studios in Los Angeles, California. He has produced albums for Artur Menezes, Reese Wynans, Eric Gales, Joanna Connor, Joanne Shaw Taylor, Marc Broussard, Larry McCray, Andy Timmons, and Joe Bonamassa among others. Guitar World magazine put Smith number 16 on their list, "The 30 best blues guitarists in the world today. In 2020, Rock and Blues Muse put Smith on their list of the "Top 15 Contemporary Blues Rock Guitarists 2020".

Discography
Josh Smith & And The Rhino Cats – Woodsheddin', 1995			
Josh Smith & The Frost – Too Damn Cold, 1997		
Josh Smith – Inception (CD, Album), 2009		
Josh Smith –I'm Gonna Be Ready ‎(CD, Album + CD + Ltd), 2011		
Josh Smith – Don't Give Up On Me ‎(CD, Album), 2012		
Josh Smith – Over Your Head'', 2015

References

External links
Josh Smith IMDb

1984 births
Living people
American male guitarists
Progressive rock guitarists
Musicians from Florida
American blues guitarists
20th-century American guitarists
Blues guitarists